Sylvester Wackerle (sometimes shown as Silvester Wackerlie, Sr.) (1 January 1908 – 3 March 1978) was a West German bobsledder who competed in the mid-1950s. He won two medals in the four-man event at the FIBT World Championships with a silver in 1954 and a bronze in 1953 (tied with Sweden).

Wackerle also finished sixth in the four-man event at the 1956 Winter Olympics in Cortina d'Ampezzo.

References
Bobsleigh four-man world championship medalists since 1930
Wallenchinsky, David. (1984). "Bobsled: Four-man". In The Complete Book of the Olympics: 1896-1980. New York: Penguin Books. p. 561.
Sylvester Wackerle's profile at Sports Reference.com

1908 births
1978 deaths
German male bobsledders
Bobsledders at the 1956 Winter Olympics
Olympic bobsledders of the United Team of Germany